Yuriy Mykolayovych Sak (born 3 January 1967) is a Ukrainian professional football coach and a former player.

Club career
He made his professional debut in the Soviet Second League in 1985 for FC Torpedo Zaporizhzhia.

International goals

Honours
 Ukrainian Cup winner: 1992
 Ukrainian Premier League runner-up: 1994–95, 1995–96
 Ukrainian Premier League bronze: 1992–93

References

External links
 

1967 births
Footballers from Zaporizhzhia
Living people
Soviet footballers
Association football midfielders
Ukrainian footballers
Ukraine international footballers
FC Metalurh Zaporizhzhia players
FC Torpedo Zaporizhzhia players
SC Odesa players
FC Chornomorets Odesa players
FC Spartak Moscow players
FC Mariupol players
PFC Krylia Sovetov Samara players
FC Obolon-Brovar Kyiv players
FC Obolon-2 Kyiv players
FC Ivan Odesa players
Ukrainian football managers
FC Palmira Odesa managers
FC Ivan Odesa managers
FC Hirnyk-Sport Horishni Plavni managers
Soviet Top League players
Russian Premier League players
Ukrainian Premier League players
Ukrainian First League players
Ukrainian Second League players
Ukrainian expatriate footballers
Expatriate footballers in Russia
Ukrainian expatriate sportspeople in Russia
FC Spartak-2 Moscow players